Sleeping States is a British musical solo project of British musician Markland Starkie (born 1981).

Started in 2004 in London, Sleeping States falls predominantly in the songwriter genre. Sleeping States has also been associated with Lo-Fi, DIY and Queercore, having released a number of 7"s, cassette-only EPs and a CD-R album on several small DIY labels in Britain, including the Queercore label/collective Homocrime and Tome Records (now a record shop in Hackney).

2008 saw Sleeping States play Wireless Festival and tour with Noah and the Whale.

Starkie played briefly in another band, Barton Carriages 2014-2016, resulting in a short album of recordings.

After a period of low activity, Starkie revived Sleeping States in 2017 for a short UK tour to mark ten years since the release of There The Open Spaces.

Discography
Albums
 In the Gardens of the North (2009) - Album on Bella Union, released August 17
 There The Open Spaces (2007) - Album  on Tome, Misra Records, EtchnSketch
 Distances Are Great (2004) - CD-R Album on Kontra-Punkte

EPs
 Old vs New (2008) - 10" / Digital EP on Bella Union, Misra Records, EtchnSketch
 Sleeping States / Francois (2006) - Cassette EP on Undereducated
 Sleeping States (2005) - Cassette EP on Kontra-Punkte
 A Year In The Life (2005) - 3" CD EP on Homocrime

Singles
 Gardens of the South (2009) - Cassette single on Bella Union
 Call Me (2008) - 7" on Single Felt Tip Records
 I Wonder / Under A Capricorn Sky (2007) - 7" Single on Caspian
 Rivers / London Fields (2006) - 7" Single on Tome Records

Notes and references

External links
Official Website
Sleeping States Myspace
Daytrotter Article (2008)
Sleeping States: There the Open Spaces
Sleeping States: In the Gardens of the North
The Quietus | Reviews | Sleeping States
Sleeping States - In The Gardens Of The North
There the Open Spaces - Sleeping States | Songs, Reviews, Credits
Sleeping States There The Open Spaces
Sleeping States: There the Open Spaces
Sleeping States: In The Gardens of the North | CD review
Album review: Sleeping States - 'In The Gardens Of The North' | NME

Musicians from London
Queercore musicians
1981 births
Living people
English LGBT musicians
Bella Union artists
Misra Records artists